Events from the year 1567 in art.

Events
 In China, the Jiajing era (1522–1566) has ended.

Paintings

 Federico Barocci – Madonna di San Simone (Galleria Nazionale delle Marche, Urbino)
 Pieter Bruegel the Elder
The Adoration of the Magi
The Massacre of the Innocents (1566-7)
The Peasant Wedding
 Gian Paolo Lomazzo – Allegory of the Lenten Feast (for San Agostino, Piacenza)
 Titian – Self-portrait (approximate date)
 Giorgio Vasari – Self-portrait (approximate date)

Births
1 May - Michiel Jansz van Mierevelt, Dutch painter (died 1641)
24 September - Martin Fréminet, French painter and engraver (died 1619)
date unknown
Nicolas Cordier, French sculptor, painter and printmaker (died 1612)
Giovanni Giacomo Pandolfi, Italian painter who worked in his native Pesaro (died 1636)
 1567/1576: Abraham Janssens, Flemish painter (died 1632)

Deaths
17 September - Pier Francesco d'Jacopo di Domenico Toschi, Italian painter of primarily religious works (born unknown)
date unknown
Lambert Barnard, English Renaissance painter (born 1485)
Pier Francesco Foschi, Italian painter active in Florence in a Mannerist style (born 1502)
Dirck Jacobsz, Dutch Renaissance painter (born 1496)
Antonio Labacco, architect, engraver, and writer (born 1495)
Ligier Richier, French sculptor (born 1500)
Jakob Seisenegger,  Austrian portrait painter used by Charles V (born 1505)
Enea Vico, Italian engraver (born 1523)

 
Years of the 16th century in art